The Boyle Lectures are named after Robert Boyle, a prominent natural philosopher of the 17th century and son of Richard Boyle, 1st Earl of Cork. Under the terms of his Will, Robert Boyle endowed a series of lectures or sermons (originally eight each year) which were to consider the relationship between Christianity and the new natural philosophy (today's 'science') then emerging in European society.

History

Early lectures 
The first such lecture was given in 1692 by Richard Bentley, to whom Isaac Newton had written:

The early lecturers were specifically charged to prove the truth of the Christian religion against Jews, Muslims and non-believers, without considering any controversies or differences that might exist between different Christian groups.  A clergyman was to be appointed to the lectureship for a term of no more than three years by Thomas Tenison (later Archbishop of Canterbury) and three other nominated trustees. Boyle had assigned the rent from his house in Crooked Lane to support the lectures but the income from that source soon disappeared.  Archbishop Tenison then arranged that the rental income from a farm in the parish of Brill in Buckinghamshire was to be paid at the rate of £12.10.00 per quarter to the lecturer.

Revival 
The Boyle Lectures were revived in 2004 at the famous Wren church of St Mary-le-Bow in the City of London by Dr Michael Byrne, a Fellow of Birkbeck College London.  Financial support for the lectures has been provided by a number of patrons, principally the Worshipful Company of Grocers and the Worshipful Company of Mercers in the city.  A book to mark the 10th anniversary of the revived series was edited by Russell Re Manning and Michael Byrne and published by SCM Press in 2013 as 'Science and Religion in the Twenty-First Century: The Boyle Lectures 2004-2013'.

Having convened the first 15 lectures in the new series, Michael Byrne stepped down as Convenor in 2018.  Management of the lecture then passed to the International Society for Science and Religion (ISSR) in cooperation with the Boyle Lectures Board of Trustees.  Members of the board include John Boyle, 15th Earl of Cork; the Hon. Robert Boyle; Julian Tregoning, Past Master of the Grocers' Company; Xenia Dennan, Past Master of the Mercers Company; the Revd George R. Bush, Rector of St Mary-le-Bow; Emeritus Professor John Hedley Brooke; Dr Russell Re Manning; Professor Fraser Watts; and the Revd Michael Reiss, President of the ISSR.

Chronological list 

 17th century
 1692 – A Confutation of Atheism, by Richard Bentley
 1693-94 - A Demonstration of the Messias, in which the Truth of the Christian Religion is proved, especially against the Jews, by Richard Kidder
 1694 - [Title Unknown], by Richard Bentley
 1695 - The Possibility, Expediency and Necessity of Divine Revelation, by John Williams
 1696 - The Perfection of the Evangelical Revelation, by John Williams
 1697 - The Certainty of the Christian Revelation and the Necessity of believing it, established, by Francis Gastrell (Bishop of Chester)
 1698 - The Atheistical Objections against the Being of God and His Attributes fairly considered and fully refuted, by John Harris
 1699 - The Credibility of the Christian Revelation, from its intrinsick Evidence, by Samuel Bradford (Bishop of Rochester)
 1700 - The Sufficiency of a Standing Revelation, by Offspring Blackall

 18th century
 1701–02 - Truth and Exellency of the Christian Religion, by George Stanhope
 1703 - Adams
 1704 - A Demonstration of the Being and Attributes of God, by Samuel Clarke
 1705 - The Evidences of Natural and Revealed Religion, by Samuel Clarke
 1706 - Arguments to Prove the Being of a God, by John Hancock
 1707 - The Accomplishment of Scripture Prophecies, by William Whiston
 1708 - The Wisdom of God in the Redemption of Man, as delivered in the Holy Scriptures, vindicated from the chief Objections of Modern Infidels, by John Turner
 1709 - Religion no Matter of Shame, by Lilly Butler
 1710 - The Divine Original and Excellence of the Christian Religion, by Josiah Woodward
 1711–12 - Physico-Theology, or a Demonstration of the Being and Attributes of God from his Works of Creation, by William Derham
 1713–14 - On the Exercise of Private Judgment, or Free-Thinking, by Benjamin Ibbot
 1717–18 - Natural Obligations to Believe the Principles of Religion and Divine Revelation, by John Leng
 1719 - An Enquiry into the Cause and Origin of Evil, by John Clarke
 1720 - On the Origin of Evil, by John Clarke
 1721 - The pretended Difficulties in Natural or Revealed Religion, no Excuse for Infidelity, by Robert Gurdon
 1724–25 - A Demonstration of True Religion, in a Chain of Consequences from certain and undeniable Principles, by Thomas Burnett
 1725–28 - John Denne
 1730–32 - The Gradual Revelation of the Gospel from the time of Man's Apostacy, by William Berriman
 1736–38 - The History of the Acts of the Holy Apostles, confirmed from other Authors, and considered as full Evidence for the Truth of Christianity, by Richard Biscoe
 1739–41 - Leonard Twells
 1747–49 - Christianity justified upon the Scripture Foundation; being a Summery View of the Controversy between Christians and Deists, by Henry Stebbing
 1750–52 - John Jortin
 1756–58 - Thomas Newton
 1759–62 - Charles Moss
 1763 - A Discourse upon the Being of God against Atheists, by Ralph Heathcote
 1766–68 - The Evidence of Christianity deduced from Facts and the Testimony of Senses throughout all Ages of the Church to the present time, by William Worthington
 1769–71 - The Intent and Propriety of the Scripture Miracles considered and explained, by Henry Owen
 1778–80 - An Argument for the Christian Religion, drawn from a Comparison of Revelation with the Natural Operations of the Mind, by James Williamson

 19th century
 1802–05 - An Historical View of the Rise and Progress of Infidelity, with a Refutation of its Principles and Reasonings, by William Van Mildert
 1812 - William Van Mildert
 1814 - Frederick Nolan

 1821 - The Connection of Christianity with Human Happiness, by William Harness
 1845–46 - The Religions of the World; and Their Relations to Christianity Considered in Eight Lectures - Frederick Denison Maurice
 1854 - Christopher Wordsworth
 1857 - Eight discourses on the miracles, by William Gilson Humphry
 1861 - The Bible and its Critics: an Enquiry into the Objective Reality of Revealed Truths, by Edward Garbett
 1862 - The Conflict between Science and Infidelity, by Edward Garbett
 1863 - The Divine Plan of Revelation, by Edward Garbett
 1864 - The conversion of the Roman empire, by Charles Merivale
 1865 - The Conversion of the Northern Nations, by Charles Merivale
 1866–67 - Christ and Christendom, by Edward Hayes Plumptre
 1868 - The Witness of the Old Testament to Christ, by Stanley Leathes
 1869 - The Witness of St. Paul to Christ, by Stanley Leathes
 1870 - The Witness of St. John to Christ, by Stanley Leathes
 1871–72 - Moral Difficulties Connected with the Bible, by James Augustus Hessey
 1874–75 - Christianity and Morality Or the Correspondence of the Gospel with the Moral Nature of Man, by Henry Wace
 1876 - What is Natural Theology?, by Alfred Barry
 1877–78 - The Manifold Witness for Christ, by Alfred Barry
 1879–80 - The Evidential Value of the Holy Eucharist, by George Frederick Maclear
 1884 - The Scientific Obstacles to Christian Belief, by George Herbert Curteis
 1890 - Old Truths in Modern Lights (The Present Conflict of Science and Theology), by T. G. Bonney
 1891 - Christian Doctrines and Modern Thought, by T. G. Bonney
 1893 - Ascent of Faith or the Grounds of Certainty in Science and Religion, by Alexander James Harrison
 1895 - The Gospel of Experience Or the Witness of Human Life to the Truth of Revelation, by W. C. E. Newbolt
 1897 - William Benham

 20th century
 1903–05 - The Testimony of St. Paul to Christ Viewed in Some of its Aspects, by Richard John Knowling
 1935–36 - God, Creation and Revelation, by Allen John MacDonald
 1965 - The Christian Universe, by Eric Mascall

 21st century
 2004 - Darwin, Design, and the Promise of Nature, by John F. Haught, with a response by Richard Chartres
 2005 - Darwin’s Compass: How Evolution Discovers the Song of Creation, by Simon Conway Morris, with a response by Keith Ward
 2006 - The Emergence of Spirit: From Complexity to Anthropology to Theology, by Philip Clayton, with a response by Niels Gregersen
 2007 - Cosmology of Ultimate Concern, by John D Barrow, with a response by Martin Rees
 2008 - Psychologising and Neurologising about Religion: Facts, Fallacies and the Future, by Malcolm Jeeves, with a response by Fraser Watts
 2009 - Misusing Darwin: The Materialist Conspiracy in Evolutionary Biology, by Keith Ward, with a response by John Polkinghorne
 2010 - The Legacy of Robert Boyle - Then and Now, by John Hedley Brooke, with a response by Geoffrey Cantor
 2011 - Is the World Unfinished? On Interactions between Science and Theology, by Jürgen Moltmann, with a response by Alan Torrance
 2012 - Christ and Evolution: A Drama of Wisdom, by Celia Deane-Drummond, with a response by Fount LeRon Shults
 2013 - Science and Religion in Dialogue, by John Polkinghorne, with a response by Richard Chartres
 2014 - New Atheism – New Apologetics: The Use of Science in Recent Christian Apologetic Writings, by Alister McGrath, with a response by Richard Harries
 2015 - Natural Theology Revisited (Again), by Russell Re Manning, with a response by Louise Hickman
 2016 - Natural Theology in a Changed Key? Evolution, Cooperation, and the God Question, by Sarah Coakley, with a response by Christopher Insole
 2017 - Theological Influences in Scientific Research Programmes: Natural Theology 'in Reverse''', by Robert J. Russell, with a response by Rowan Williams
 2018 - Apocalypses Now: Modern Science and Biblical Miracles, by Mark Harris, with a response by John Hedley Brooke
2019 - Science, Religion and Ethics, by Michael Reiss
2020 - Mental Health and the Gospel, by Christopher Cook, with a response by Fraser Watts
2021 - The Rediscovery of Contemplation Through Science'', by Tom McLeish, with a response by Rowan Williams

References

External links
 Boyle, Robert, and the Boyle Lectures, in The New Schaff-Herzog Encyclopedia of Religious Knowledge, Vol. II (CCEL)

Christian theological lectures
Lectures on religion and science
Philosophy events